B61 may refer to:
 B61 nuclear bomb
 B61 (New York City bus) in Brooklyn
 HLA-B61, an HLA serotype
 Sicilian, Richter-Rauzer, Encyclopaedia of Chess Openings code
 Alternative name for the ephrin A1, human gene

B-61 may refer to:
 B-61 Matador, the first operational surface-to-surface cruise missile built by the United States